From 1962 to 1976 the head of state under the Trinidad and Tobago Independence Act 1962 was the Queen of Trinidad and Tobago, Elizabeth II, who was also the Queen of the United Kingdom and the other Commonwealth realms. The queen was represented in Trinidad and Tobago by a governor-general. Trinidad and Tobago became a republic under the Constitution of 1976 and the monarch and governor-general were replaced by a ceremonial president.

Monarch (1962–1976)
The succession to the throne was the same as the succession to the British throne.

Governor-general
The governor-general was the representative of the monarch in Trinidad and Tobago and exercised most of the powers of the monarch. The governor-general was appointed for an indefinite term, serving at the pleasure of the monarch. After the passage of the Statute of Westminster 1931, the governor-general was appointed solely on the advice of the Cabinet of Trinidad and Tobago, without the involvement of the British government. In the event of a vacancy the chief justice served as officer administering the government.

Status

President of Trinidad and Tobago
Under the 1976 Constitution of the Republic of Trinidad and Tobago, the president replaced the monarch as head of state. The president was elected by Parliament for a five-year term. In the event of a vacancy the President of the Senate served as acting president.

Status

Standards

References

External links
 World Statesmen – Trinidad and Tobago
 Rulers.org – Trinidad and Tobago

Government of Trinidad and Tobago
H
 
Trinidad and Tobago
Trinidad and Tobago